Kalampora, also known as Kalampur or Kalam Pora, is a village in Pulwama district of Jammu and Kashmir, India. This village is situated between Shopian district at a distance of 14 km towards South and Pulwama at a distance of 15 km towards North where its district headquarters are located. It takes 1 hour and 44 minutes to cover the distance of 47 km between Kalampora and state summer capital Srinagar

Population
According to The 15th Indian Census report, there are 365 householders residing in Kalampora village where, the total population is 2606 of which, 1364 are males and 1242 are females. The literacy rate recorded against the literacy rate 67.16% of Jammu and Kashmir, was 58.59% including men and women.

Educational institutes
In Kalampora, The AL-Qalam Bright career Public school is working under the Shadimarg zone which provides education up to 5th or 8th class. The Department of Education J&K, has established a school (officially known as HS Kalampora) which provides elementary education to the students of this village.

References 

Villages in Pulwama district